Atterson Walden Rucker (April 3, 1847 – July 19, 1924) was an American lawyer, mining executive, and politician who served as a U.S. Representative from Colorado from 1909 to 1913. He had previously served in the Confederate States Army during the Civil War.

Biography
Born in Harrodsburg, Kentucky, Rucker moved in early youth with his parents to Missouri.  He attended the common schools.  He served four years in the Confederate States Army during the Civil War.  He studied law, was admitted to the bar in 1868 and commenced practice in Lexington, Missouri, the following year.

He moved to Baxter Springs, Kansas, in 1873 and resumed the practice of law.  He moved to Leadville, Colorado, in 1879 and continued the practice of his profession.  He was also interested in mining.  He served as judge of the court of records of Lake County in 1881 and 1882.  He moved to Aspen, Colorado, in 1885 and became largely interested in the development of mining projects.

Congress and retirement
Rucker was elected as a Democrat to the Sixty-first and Sixty-second Congresses (March 4, 1909 – March 3, 1913).  He was an unsuccessful candidate for renomination in 1912.

He returned to Colorado and settled in Denver, where he resumed his career in the mining business. He died near Mount Morrison, Colorado, on July 19, 1924.  He was interred in the Littleton Cemetery, Littleton, Colorado.

References

Sources
 Retrieved on 2009-03-02

External links

1847 births
1924 deaths
People from Harrodsburg, Kentucky
Colorado lawyers
Democratic Party members of the United States House of Representatives from Colorado
Colorado state court judges
People of Missouri in the American Civil War
Confederate States Army soldiers
People from Baxter Springs, Kansas
19th-century American lawyers